Navneet Kaur may refer to:

 Navneet Kaur Rana  (born 1986), Indian actress
 Navneet Kaur Dhillon  (born 1992), Indian actress, model and pageant winner
 Navneet Kaur (field hockey) (born 1996), Indian field hockey player